The 2022 Winnipeg National Bank Challenger was a professional tennis tournament played on outdoor hard courts. It was the 5th edition of the tournament and part of the 2022 ATP Challenger Tour. It took place in Winnipeg, Manitoba, Canada between July 25 and July 31, 2022.

Singles main-draw entrants

Seeds

1 Rankings are as of July 18, 2022.

Other entrants
The following players received wildcards into the singles main draw:
 Gabriel Diallo
 Liam Draxl
 Jaden Weekes

The following players received entry from the qualifying draw:
  Juan Carlos Aguilar
  Alafia Ayeni
  Kyle Edmund
  Govind Nanda
  Zachary Svajda
  Evan Zhu

The following player received entry as a lucky loser:
  Sho Shimabukuro

Champions

Singles

 Emilio Gómez def.  Alexis Galarneau 6–3, 7–6(7–4).

Doubles
 
 Billy Harris /  Kelsey Stevenson def.  Max Schnur /  John-Patrick Smith 2–6, 7–6(11–9), [10–8].

References

2022 ATP Challenger Tour
2022
July 2022 sports events in Canada
2022 in Canadian sports